Next Level may refer to:

Next Level (arcade), a video arcade in Brooklyn, New York, US
Next Level (film), a 2019 American dance film
Next Level Church, Matthews, North Carolina, US
Next Level Games, a Canadian video game developer

Music
Next Level (Aligator album), 2012
Next Level (Ayumi Hamasaki album), 2009
"Next Level" (Ayumi Hamasaki song), the title song
The Next Level, an album by Diljit Dosanjh, 2009
"Next Level", a song by Mary J. Blige from My Life II... The Journey Continues (Act 1), 2011
"Next Level", a song by Showbiz and A.G. from Goodfellas, 1995
"Next Level", a song by YU-KI, theme song for Kamen Rider Kabuto, 2006
"Next Level" (Aespa song), 2021